Pilot Grove Township may refer to:

 Pilot Grove Township, Hancock County, Illinois
 Pilot Grove Township, Montgomery County, Iowa, in Montgomery County, Iowa
 Pilot Grove Township, Faribault County, Minnesota
 Pilot Grove Township, Cooper County, Missouri
 Pilot Grove Township, Moniteau County, Missouri

Township name disambiguation pages